The Vodacom Challenge was an association football pre-season tournament that featured Vodacom-sponsored South African clubs Orlando Pirates and Kaizer Chiefs plus from 2006 onwards an invited European club. Prior to 2006, the competition consisted of the two Soweto giants and two invited African clubs.

Tottenham Hotspur became the first non-African team to win the competition in 2007.

According to the tournament promoter, Jabu Mathibela the tournament was cancelled due to "time constraints" before the 2012 season would have commenced.

Vodacom Challenge Final with African Teams

Vodacom Challenge Results with European Teams

Invited African clubs

1999
  ASEC Mimosas
  Esperance de Tunis

2000
  Africa Sports
  Dynamos FC

2001
  Asante Kotoko
  Hearts of Oak

2002
  Asante Kotoko
  FC St. Eloi Lupopo

2003
  TP Mazembe
  FC St. Eloi Lupopo

2004
  AS Vita Club
  TP Mazembe

2005
  AS Vita Club
  Green Buffaloes

Invited European clubs

2006
  Manchester United

2007
  Tottenham Hotspur

2008
  Manchester United

2009
  Manchester City

2011
  Tottenham Hotspur

References

External links
Vodacom Challenge Official Website
Vodacom Official Website
Premier Soccer League
South African Football Association
Confederation of African Football

 
South African soccer friendly trophies